Hasmukh Jamnadas Baradi (23 December 1938 – 4 February 2017) was a Gujarati playwright, theater artist and theater critic from India.

Early life and education

Baradi was born on 23 December 1938 in Rajkot. After completing his primary and secondary education in Rajkot, he received a diploma in theater direction from Saurashtra Sangit Natak Academy in 1961. Afterwards, he joined the Gujarat University, where he earned a Bachelor of Arts in 1964 in English literature and Sanskrit. He received a Master of Arts in Theater History from Lunacharsky State Institute for Theatre Arts, Moscow in 1972. From 1959 to 1964, he worked as a playwright at Aakashvani in Vadodara and Rajkot.

Works

Baradi attempted a fusion of tradition and modernity in his plays. He ran the Garage Studio Theater, which performed in Bhavai theatrical style, a traditional folk theatrical form particularly common in Western India. He wrote many plays within the Bhavai form which delved on topics of social reforms.

Baradi wrote Kalo Kamlo ( Black Blanket), an experimental psychological play which he had published in 1975, and was translated into Hindi in 1980 as Kala Kambal. He also wrote Raino Darpanrai, an adaptation of Raino Parvat, as well as Baradina Be Natako (1984), Janardan Joseph (1985), Pachhi Shebaji Bolia, Jashumati Kankuvati, Eklu Aakash ane Bija Natako, Tame Aanathi Ramtata and Akhu Aikhu Farithi. In addition, Baradi translated Uncle Vanya by Anton Chekhov into Gujarati as Vanya Mama (1983).

In 1983, Baradi wrote Natak Sarikho Nadar Hunnar (1983), a work of theater criticism. He also wrote Gujarati Theaterno Itihas, a literary history of Gujarati theater, which was translated into English by Vinod Meghani as The History of Gujarati Theatre in 2004.

Death
He died on 4 February 2017 in Ahmedabad. His daughter, Manvita Baradi, is a director, theater teacher, and architect in Ahmedabad.

Awards
Baradi received the Narmad Suvarna Chandrak in 1987 for writing Raino Darpanrai (1986), and received Kumar Suvarna Chandrak in 1981 for his overall contributions to Gujarati theater. He received Critics' Award of 1988 for Raino Darpanrai.

References

1938 births
2017 deaths
People from Rajkot district
Writers from Gujarat
Gujarati-language writers
Gujarati theatre
20th-century Indian dramatists and playwrights
Indian male dramatists and playwrights
20th-century Indian male writers
Indian theatre critics